"Can't Knock the Hustle" is a song by the American rock band Weezer, released on October 11, 2018 as the lead single for their self titled album, also called the Black Album. A music video was released on the same day.

Composition

"Can't Knock the Hustle" was produced by Dave Sitek of TV on the Radio fame. The song contains influences from funk music and Latin music. It is described as a funk rock song by Stereogum and disco by Paste, while Beyond the Stage Magazine categorizes it as pop rock. It is also one of the only Weezer songs to use strong profanity.

Music video

A music video was released for the song on October 11, 2018, and was produced by Jerry Media and directed by Guy Blelloch.

None of the band's members appear in the video, but Rivers Cuomo's glasses are worn by Fall Out Boy's Pete Wentz (known as Rivers Wentz in the video), who is driving the car. Wentz's character is repeatedly disrupted by two passengers in the back of the vehicle, played by  James Ohliger and Romane Recalde, who are shown to be making out, and later, arguing and stabbing each other, ending with them being driven to the emergency room.

Charts

Weekly charts

Year-end charts

References

2018 singles
2018 songs
American pop rock songs
American disco songs
Funk rock songs
Songs written by Rivers Cuomo
Weezer songs